John Hugh Elliott (July 5, 1876 – December 12, 1956) was an American actor who appeared on Broadway and in over 300 films during his career. He worked sporadically during the silent film era, but with the advent of sound his career took off, where he worked constantly for 25 years, finding a particular niche in "B" westerns.

His versatility allowed him to play both "good guys" and "bad guys" with equal aplomb, working right up until his death in 1956.

Early life 
Elliott was born in July 1876 in Keosauqua, Iowa to Sarah E. Norris and Jehue S. Elliott. He was the third of four children, and the only boy; his two older sisters were named Elizabeth and Fanny, with his younger sister named Nina. In February 1897, when Elliott was 20, his mother, his sister Fanny came down with typhoid fever. Elliott would be the only one of the three to survive. Two months later, on April 14, Elliot married Cleo Kelly, despite her parents' objections to her marrying an actor.

Career 
Elliot began his acting career on stage, where he reached Broadway in 1917, appearing as Robert Goring in the very successful play, Eyes of Youth.  The play was produced by A. H. Woods, Lee Shubert, and Jacob J. Shubert, and ran for over a year at the Maxine Elliott Theatre. Elliott's screen debut came in the featured role of Sir Robert Eastbourne in the 1919 silent film When a Man Loves. Less than two dozen of his film appearances were during the silent era. Beginning with the advent of sound, Elliott would begin to make the bulk of his 300 film appearances.

In 1930, he had the featured role of General Robert E. Lee in Only the Brave (1930), starring Gary Cooper. It was a role he would play in several films, such as Carolina (1934), starring Janet Gaynor and Lionel Barrymore; and Operator 13 (1934), again starring Cooper. His roles would run the gamut, from small nameless roles, as a banker in the 1939 film, The Story of Alexander Graham Bell, starring Don Ameche and Loretta Young; to smaller named roles such as Captain Wilkins in The Conquering Horde (1931), starring Richard Arlen and Fay Wray; to featured roles like that of Jess Roarke in 1936's Ridin' On.

Other notable films in which Elliot appeared include: a small role as a padre in Michael Curtiz' 1934 military drama, The Key, starring William Powell; a bit part as one of the directors in the 1935 comedy, A Night at the Ritz, starring William Gargan; as Judge Matthews in 1939's Jesse James, starring Tyrone Power and Henry Fonda; the role of Tremont in Hold That Co-ed , a 1938 comedy starring John Barrymore, George Murphy and Marjorie Weaver; a small role as a purchaser in the 1938 drama Kentucky, starring Loretta Young and Richard Greene; a small role in Orson Welles' 1942 historical drama, The Magnificent Ambersons, starring Joseph Cotten, Dolores Costello, Anne Baxter, and Tim Holt; an admiral in 1944's Marine Raiders, starring Pat O'Brien, Robert Ryan, and Ruth Hussey; the role of Hooker in Randolph Scott's 1946 western, Badman's Territory; as the judge in the 1947 film noir The Unfaithful, starring Ann Sheridan, Lew Ayres and Zachary Scott; as a train conductor in the 1947 biopic The Babe Ruth Story, starring William Bendix and Claire Trevor; as a workman in Jean Renoir's 1947 drama, The Woman on the Beach, starring Robert Ryan, Joan Bennett, and Charles Bickford; as a clerk in Orson Welles' film noir, The Lady from Shanghai, starring Rita Hayworth and Welles; and as a judge in the 1949 crime drama, Flaxy Martin, starring Virginia Mayo. His final appearance in a feature film was as the minister in George Cukor's 1952 comedy-drama, The Marrying Kind, starring Aldo Ray and Judy Holliday. His final acting appearance was in the 1956 western serial, Perils of the Wilderness, in the role of Homer Lynch.

Death 
Elliott died on December 12, 1956, in Los Angeles, less than a year after the release of his final performance.

Filmography

(Per AFI database)

 When a Man Loves  (1919) as Sir Robert Eastbourne
 Homer Comes Home  (1920) as Mr. Bailly (as John H. Elliot)
 Are All Men Alike? (1920) as Uncle Chandler
 Held In Trust  (1920) as Jasper Haig (as John H. Elliott)
 A Master Stroke (1920) as George Trevor (as John Elliot)
 Her Winning Way  (1921) as Mallon
 The Eagle's Feather  (1923) as Parson Winger
 The Spoilers  (1923) as Bill Wheaton
 Flaming Waters (1925) as Professor Richard Crawford
 Christine of the Big Tops  (1926) as Dr. Hastings
 Racing Blood (1926) as Johnn Sterling
 What Happened to Jones  (1926) as The Bishop
 Horse Shoes  (1927) as William Baker
 Million Dollar Mystery  (1927) as Stanley Hargreaves / Inspector Jedson
 The Phantom in the House  (1929) as Police Captain
 For the Defense  (1930) as Joseph McGann (uncredited)
 Only the Brave  (1930) as Gen. Robert E. Lee
 The Rampant Age (1930) as Arnold Benton
 The Widow From Chicago  (1930) as Detective T. Finnegan (uncredited)
 Oklahoma Jim  (1931) as Indian Agent
 The Conquering Horde  (1931) as Capt. Wilkins
 Galloping Thru  (1931) as Mr. Winton
 Secret Menace  (1931) as John Grant
 Dugan of the Bad Lands  (1931) as Sheriff Manning
 Mother and Son  (1931) as Mr. Winfield (as John Elliot)
 God's Country and the Man  (1931) as Young
 The Montana Kid  (1931) as Burke
 Two Fisted Justice  (1931) as Mr. Cameron - Nancy's Father
 Call Her Savage  (1932) as Hank (uncredited)
 Hidden Valley (1932) as Judge
 The Night of June 13 (1932) as Real Estate Agent (uncredited)
 Riders of the Desert  (1932) as Dad Houston
 Texas Pioneers  (1932) as Colonel Thomas
 Vanishing Men (1932) as Heck Claiborne
 South of Santa Fe  (1932) as Thornton
 From Broadway to Cheyenne  (1932) as Martin Kildare
 Single-Handed Sanders (1932) as Senator Graham
 Week Ends Only  (1932) as Bartender
 Lucky Larrigan  (1932) as J. C. Bailey (as John Elliot)
 Breed of the Border  (1933) as Judge Stafford
 The Gallant Fool (1933) as Chris McDonald
 As the Earth Turns  (1934) as Country Doctor (uncredited) (as John H. Elliott)
 Operator 13  (1934) as Gen. Robert E. Lee (uncredited)
 Ticket to a Crime (1934) as Mr. Davidson
 Upper World  (1934) as Crandall (scenes deleted)
 I Can't Escape  (1934) as Mr. Douglas (uncredited)
 I Sell Anything  (1934) as Lawyer (uncredited)
 The Murder in the Museum  (1934) as Detective Chief Snell
 Green Eyes  (1934) as Chemist (uncredited)
 One in a Million  (1934)
 The Key  (1934) as Gen. Robert E. Lee (uncredited)
 Desirable  (1934)
 Gentlemen Are Born  (1934) as Bill - Night Editor (uncredited) (as John H. Elliott)
 Side Streets  (1934) as The Judge (uncredited)
 A Lost Lady  (1934) as Bridge Player (uncredited)
 Carolina  (1934) as Gen. Robert E. Lee (as John Elliot)
 Kid Courageous  (1934) as High-Hat Clickett
 The Quitter (1934) as Advertiser
 Cowboy Holiday  (1934) as Sheriff Hank Simpson
 Fighting Pioneers  (1935) as Major Dent (as John Elliot)
 Captured in Chinatown  (1935) as Butler—City Editor
 A Night at the Ritz  (1935) as Director (uncredited) (as John H. Elliott)
 The Girl Who Came Back  (1935) as Police Captain (uncredited)
 Rainbow's End  (1935) as Adam Ware
 Bulldog Courage  (1935) as Judge Charley Miller
 Big Calibre  (1935) as Rusty Hicks
 Danger Trails  (1935) as George Wilson - aka Pecos
 Make a Million  (1935) as Dean
 Saddle Aces  (1935) as The Judge (as John Elliot)
 Sunset Range  (1935) as Dan Caswell
 Toll of the Desert  (1935) as Judge
 Wagon Trail (1935) as Judge
 Frontier Justice  (1935) as Ben Livesay
 Tombstone Terror  (1935) as Mr. Dixon
 Trigger Tom  (1935) as Nord Jergenson
 Trails of the Wild  (1935) as Tom Madison
 Unconquered Bandit  (1935) as Mr. Morgan, Tom's Father
 Red Hot Tires  (1935)
 Skull and Crown  (1935) as John Norton
 What Price Crime  (1935) as Chief Radcliff (as John Elliot)
 Bars of Hate  (1935) as The Sheriff
 The Rider of the Law  (1935) as Town Mayor
 The Drunkard  (1935) as Third Drunk
 Lawless Border  (1935) as Border Patrol chief (as John Elliot)
 Vagabond Lady  (1935) as Poolside Master of Ceremonies (uncredited) (as John H. Elliott)
 Midnight Phantom  (1935) as Capt. Bill Withers
 Danger Ahead  (1935) as Capt. Matthews
 Frontier Justice (1935) as Ben Livesay
 Kelly of the Secret Service  (1936) as Howard Walsh
 The Rogues' Tavern  (1936) as Mr. Jamison
 Avenging Waters  (1936) as Charles Mortimer
 Millionaire Kid  (1936) as Yellerton (as John Elliot)
 Rip Roarin' Buckaroo  (1936) as Colonel Hayden
 Times Square Playboy  (1936) as Sam - chairman of the Board of Directors (uncredited)
 Ambush Valley  (1936) as Bob Morgan (uncredited)
 The Crime of Dr. Forbes  (1936) as Faculty Doctor (uncredited)
 Prison Shadows  (1936) as The Police Captain
 Hearts Divided  (1936) as James Monroe (uncredited)
 Vengeance of Rannah  (1936) as Doc Adams (as John Elliot)
 A Face in the Fog  (1936) as Detective Davis
 Ridin' On  (1936) as Jess Roarke
 Snowed Under  (1936) as First Actor (scenes deleted)
 Roarin' Guns  (1936) as Bob Morgan
 Roamin' Wild  (1936) as Chief Inspector Reed
 Trail Dust  (1936) as John Clark
 Phantom of the Range  (1936) as Hiram Moore
 Men of the Plains  (1936) as Dad Baxter (as John Elliot)
 The Fugitive Sheriff (1936) as Judge Roberts
 Legion of Terror  (1936) as Postmaster (uncredited)
 Rio Grande Ranger  (1936) as John Cullen (as John Elliot)
 Dodge City Trail  (1936)
 Death in the Air  (1936) as Dr. Norris
 Souls at Sea  (1937)
 Smoke Tree Range  (1937) as Jim Cary
 Submarine D-1  (1937) as Father on Pier (uncredited)
 The Shadow Strikes  (1937) as Chester Randall (uncredited) (as John Elliot)
 Children of Loneliness  (1937)
 Love Is on the Air  (1937) as Mr. Grant McKenzie (uncredited) (as John H. Elliott)
 Flying Fists  (1937) as Jim Conrad
 Headin' East  (1937) as M.H. Benson
 Hold That Co-ed  (1938) as Legislator (uncredited)
 Kentucky  (1938) as Cal (uncredited)
 Cassidy of Bar 20  (1938) as Tom Dillon
 Heart of Arizona  (1938) as Buck Peters
 Keep Smiling  (1938) as Spence (uncredited) (as John H. Elliott)
 Trigger Fingers  (1939) as Jim Bolton
 The Story of Alexander Graham Bell  (1939) as Banker at Demo (uncredited)
 Jesse James  (1939) as Judge Mathews
 Port of Hate  (1939) as Stevens
 The Invisible Killer (1939) as Gambler
 Mystery Plane  (1939) as Army Colonel
 Mesquite Buckaroo  (1939) as Tavern Owner Hawk
 The Fighting Renegade  (1939) as Prospector (as John Elliot)
 Death Rides the Range  (1939) as Hiram Crabtree
 The Great Profile  (1940) as Pop - Stage Doorman (uncredited)
 Lightning Strikes West  (1940) as Dr. Jenkins
 Covered Wagon Trails (1940) as Beaumont - Rancher
 Gun Code (1940) as Parson A. Hammond
 Phantom Rancher  (1940) as Dad Markham
 Lone Star Raiders  (1940) as Dad Cameron
 The Tulsa Kid  (1940) as Judge Perkins
 The Man Who Wouldn't Talk  (1940) as Juror (uncredited) (as John H. Elliot)
 The Apache Kid  (1941) as Judge John Taylor
 Golden Hoofs  (1941) as Race Announcer (uncredited)
 The Kid's Last Ride  (1941) as Disher
 Marry the Boss's Daughter  (1941) as Cynical Passerby (uncredited)
 Private Nurse  (1941) as Clerk (uncredited)
 Ride, Kelly, Ride  (1941) as Doctor (uncredited)
 The Texas Marshal  (1941) as John Gorham
 Gentleman from Dixie (1941) as Prosecutor
 The Lone Rider in Frontier Fury  (1941) as Jim Bowen
 Tumbledown Ranch in Arizona  (1941) as Judge Jones
 Saddle Mountain Roundup  (1941) as 'Magpie' Harper
 Billy the Kid's Round-Up (1941) as Red Gap Judge (uncredited)
 Come on Danger  (1942) as Saunders
 Border Roundup  (1942) as Jeff Sloane
 Land of the Open Range  (1942) as George 'Dad' Cook
 The Mad Monster  (1942) as Professor Hatfield
 The Magnificent Ambersons  (1942) as Guest (uncredited)
 Overland Stagecoach  (1942) as Jeff Clark
 Pirates of the Prairie  (1942) as John Spencer (as John H. Elliott)
 Rock River Renegades  (1942) as Dick Ross
 Rolling Down the Great Divide  (1942) as Lem Bartlett
 Red River Robin Hood  (1942) as Mr. Brady (uncredited)
 Calling Dr. Death  (1943) as Priest
 Corvette K-225  (1943) as Merchant Captain (uncredited)
 Fighting Valley  (1943) as Frank Burke
 First Comes Courage  (1943) as Norwegian Patient (uncredited) (as John H. Elliott)
 Death Rides the Plains  (1943) as James Marshall
 Law of the Saddle  (1943) as Dan Kirby
 My Kingdom for a Cook  (1943) as Janitor (uncredited)
 Raiders of San Joaquin  (1943) as R.R. Vice President Morgan
 Sagebrush Law  (1943) as Cole Winters (as John H. Elliott)
 Tenting Tonight on the Old Camp Ground  (1943) as Inspector Talbot
 Two Fisted Justice  (1943) as Uncle Will Hodgins
 You're a Lucky Fellow, Mr. Smith  (1943) as Lawyer (uncredited)
 Cattle Stampede  (1943) as Dr. George Arnold
 The Heavenly Body  (1944) as Prof. Collier (uncredited)
 Heavenly Days  (1944) as An Average Citizen (uncredited)
 Fuzzy Settles Down  (1944) as John Martin (Newspaper Editor)
 Experiment Perilous  (1944) as Phone Operator (uncredited)
 Dead Man's Eyes  (1944) as Travers the Butler (uncredited)
 Marine Raiders  (1944) as Admiral (uncredited)
 Mr. Winkle Goes to War  (1944) as Walker (uncredited)
 Oklahoma Raiders  (1944) as Judge Clem Masters
 Bowery to Broadway  (1944) as Reformer (uncredited)
 Home in Indiana  (1944) as Man Seated Left of J.T. in Bar (uncredited)
 Marshal of Gunsmoke  (1944) as Judge Brown (uncredited)
 Wild Horse Phantom  (1944) as Prison Warden
 Night Club Girl  (1945)
 Allotment Wives  (1945) as Police Doctor
 Eadie Was a Lady  (1945) as Butler (uncredited)
 Escape in the Fog  (1945) as Thomas - the Butler (uncredited) (as John H. Elliott)
 Hollywood and Vine  (1945) as Judge (uncredited)
 One Way to Love  (1946) as Butler (uncredited)
 Badman's Territory  (1946) as Brother Hooker (uncredited)
 The Dark Corner  (1946) as Laundry Proprietor (uncredited)
 Deadline at Dawn  (1946) as Sleepy Man (uncredited)
 The Devil's Mask  (1946) as John the Butler (uncredited)
 Frontier Gunlaw  (1946) as Pop Evans
 Moon Over Montana  (1946) as Judge (uncredited)
 Cry Wolf  (1947) as Clergyman (voice, uncredited)
 The Fighting Vigilantes  (1947) as Bert (as John Elliot)
 Law of the Lash  (1947) as Dad Hilton
 Millie's Daughter  (1947) as Butler (uncredited)
 News Hounds  (1947) as Judge (as John H. Elliott)
 Nora Prentiss  (1947)
 The Unfaithful  (1947) as Judge Edward R. McVey (uncredited)
 The Woman on the Beach  (1947) as Old Workman (uncredited)
 The Lady from Shanghai  (1947) as Court Clerk (uncredited)
 Angels' Alley  (1948) as Magistrate E.J. Saunders (as John H. Elliott)
 The Babe Ruth Story  (1948) as Conductor (scenes deleted) (as John H. Elliott)
 The Countess of Monte Cristo  (1948) as Innkeeper (uncredited)
 I Wouldn't Be in Your Shoes  (1948) as Mr. Lake - Tom's Lawyer (as John H. Elliott)
 Letter from an Unknown Woman  (1948) as Flower Vendor (uncredited) (as John Elliot)
 Smart Woman  (1948) as Harker (uncredited) (as John H. Elliott)
 Smoky Mountain Melody  (1948) as Englesby
 Flaxy Martin  (1949) as Judge Edward R. McVey (uncredited)
 Homicide  (1949) as Doctor (uncredited)
 The Arizona Cowboy  (1950) as Ace Allen
 The Marrying Kind  (1952) as Minister (uncredited)

References

External links

 
 

1876 births
1956 deaths
Male actors from Iowa
20th-century American male actors
American male silent film actors